Established the day after the Independence of Mali in 1961, l’Ensemble instrumental national is an orchestra of traditional Malian music and song.

Its mission is to maintain and give value to the heritage of Malian forms of music and song.

Repertoire
Duga : (Hymn of bravery)
Maliba : (Glory to Mali)
Mamaya
Soweto (a memory of Soweto)
Sogo : (hymn for the hunters, symbols of honesty and bravery)
Soundiata : (Mandingue Epic)
Dâ Monzon : (Bambaran Epic)
Sosso : (to encourage joy, happiness, and love)
Taara : (homage to bravery)
Sécurité : (homage to the army)
Janjo : (homage to bravery)
Musolu : (homage to women)
Cedo : (homage to bravery)
Bamba Niaré : Jatigiya (Hospitality)

Tours
1961 : Artistic tour in USSR
1964 : Animation Salon International de POCORA/Pris (France)
1964 : Festival des Arts Nègres à Dakar (Sénégal)
1977 : Festival Mondial des Arts Nègres (FESTAC.77)
1978 : Algeria
1979 : Festival in Guinea (Conakry)
1979 : France, Germany, Switzerland, and the Netherlands
1980 : Niger
1983 : China, Korea, and USSR
1986 : Korea
1987 : Festival in Libya
1996 : Festival Republic of Congo-Brazzaville (FESPAM)
1997 : New Orleans Jazz Festival (USA) and performance in New York
1999 : 4th Annual « Roots Festival à Banjul » (Gambia)
2000 : Malian Fair in Paris
2000 : CAN at Accra (Ghana)
2001 : Faire at the Gallery Fayette-Paris
2002 : Dakar (Sénégal)
2003 : Night of solidarity and intégration (Ouagadougou)
2003 : Folklife Festival in Washington, DC

Prizes
1963 : Medal for the Folklore of National Theater at Paris.
1966 : Gold medal (first prize) at the Festival of Black Arts at Dakar
1969 : Gold medal (first prize) at the Pan-African Arts Festival in Algier (Algeria)
1995 : Gold medal of Melody at Johannesburg (Fair Afro-Arabe)

Instruments
Kora
Balafon
Flute
N’Goni
N’Polon
Kamalen N’Goni
Dundun
Soku
Djembé

Discography
One Album, 33 Days
Epopée Mandingue
Epopée Bambara
Musolu

References

External links
A TV recording

Malian musical groups